Sheikh Kamal International Club Cup, also known as Sheikh Kamal Gold Cup, is a biennial international club football tournament held in Bangladesh. The inaugural edition took place in 2015. It is hosted by the Chittagong Abahani in association with the Bangladesh Football Federation. The tournament is held in the M. A. Aziz Stadium, in the port city of Chittagong.

Eight clubs from various countries participate in the tournament.

Tournament summaries

Participating teams 
19 different clubs from 11 countries have participated in the tournament.

† Bold year represents the champion of that year.

Statistics

All-time top scorers

Top scorers by edition

References

Sheikh Kamal International Club Cup
Football cup competitions in Bangladesh
Sheikh Mujibur Rahman family